Hypancistrus phantasma is a species of catfish in the family Loricariidae. It is native to South America, where it occurs in the Vaupés River in the Rio Negro drainage in the Amazon basin in Brazil. The species reaches 12.3 cm (4.8 inches) SL. Its specific epithet means "phantom" in Latin, referring to the species' notable elusiveness and its pale coloration. It was described in 2016 by Milton Tan and Jonathan W. Armbruster on the basis of coloration, alongside the related species Hypancistrus margaritatus. 

H. phantasma was described based on only a small number of specimens collected in 1924, and it has reportedly not been collected since, nor is it known in the aquarium trade, unlike H. margaritatus.

References 

Ancistrini
Fish described in 2016